The 2019 National Hockey League All-Star Game was held at SAP Center in San Jose, home of the San Jose Sharks on January 26, 2019. San Jose last held the NHL All Star Game in 1997. This was the fourth consecutive All-Star Game that used a four-team, 3-on-3, single elimination format, with one team representing each of the league's four divisions. After years of being held on a Sunday, the 2019 All-Star Game was played on a Saturday, January 26, at 5:00 p.m. PST / 8:00 p.m. EST, while the Skills Competition was also moved from its traditional Saturday night to Friday, January 25, 2019.

The Metropolitan All-Stars won the All-Star Game, which was in its fourth straight year of a four-team, 3-on-3, single elimination format, with one team representing each of the league's four divisions. The team won $1 million (split 11 ways between the players). Sidney Crosby of the Pittsburgh Penguins was named the Most Valuable Player, scoring four goals and four assists. He received a new 2019 Honda Passport which he then proceeded to give to an Army veteran.

Skills Competition 

The Skills Competition took place the day before the All-Star Game on Friday January 25, 2019 at the SAP Center. The winners of each event were awarded $25,000 in prize money.

The league invited Renata Fast and Rebecca Johnston from the Canadian Women's National Team, and Brianna Decker and Kendall Coyne Schofield from the U.S. Women's National Team, to demonstrate some of the events. After Nathan MacKinnon of the Colorado Avalanche (Central Division) pulled out of the fastest-skater event due to a bruised left foot, Coyne Schofield was named as his replacement, becoming the first woman to compete in the All-Stars skills competition.

Brianna Decker demonstrated the premier passer skill, but she was not part of the competition. She was, in fact, three seconds faster than Leon Draisaitl and would have won had her time been included as they did with Kendall Coyne Schofield. This prompted the hashtag #PayDecker on Twitter, as women's hockey salaries are a fraction of men's hockey salaries. On January 26, hockey equipment company CCM announced they would give Decker the $25,000 she would have received for winning the competition.

Results

Fastest Skater

Puck Control Play

Save Streak

Premier Passer

Hardest Shot

Accuracy Shooting

Rosters
As in the previous three All-Star Games, captaincy of each division was determined by a fan vote, the 2019 vote running from December 1, 2018, until December 23, 2018. On December 27, the four captains were announced by the NHL. For the third straight year, Connor McDavid of the Edmonton Oilers was selected to captain the Pacific Division, along with first time captains Auston Matthews of the Toronto Maple Leafs for the  Atlantic Division and Nathan MacKinnon of the Colorado Avalanche for the Central Division. Alexander Ovechkin of the Washington Capitals was selected for the Metropolitan Division, but Ovechkin opted to abstain from the game to rest. Fans were also permitted, after most of the rest of the rosters were set, to vote for a "Last Man In" for each division. The Last Men In—Jeff Skinner (Atlantic), Gabriel Landeskog (Central), Kris Letang (Metropolitan) and Leon Draisaitl (Pacific)—were announced January 11.

On January 6, the coaches for the All-Star Game were announced, chosen from the team in each division with the highest points percentage through January 5, roughly the regular season's halfway point: Jon Cooper of the Tampa Bay Lightning (Atlantic),  Todd Reirden of the Washington Capitals (Metropolitan), Paul Maurice of the Winnipeg Jets (Central), and Bill Peters of the Calgary Flames (Pacific).

Eastern Conference

~ Voted as "Last Man In".
† Replaced Carey Price (Montreal Canadiens) due to injury.

~ Voted as "Last Man In".
†Alexander Ovechkin (C) (Washington Capitals) opted to abstain from the game to rest.
‡ Replaced Taylor Hall (New Jersey Devils) due to injury.
* Did not participate in Skills Competition due to illness.

Western Conference

~ Voted as "Last Man In".
* Did not participate in Skills Competition or All-Star Games due to injury (still attended All-Star weekend). Replaced by Kendall Coyne Schofield in the Skills Competition.

~ Voted as "Last Man In".

Bracket

Game summaries

First semifinal game

Second semifinal game

Final

Uniforms
The All-Star uniforms for this game were created by Adidas Parley, the partnership between Adidas and the environmental organization Parley for the Oceans that produces products made with plastic ocean debris. Also for the first time, the uniforms featured each player's respective team logo on the front instead of the NHL shield or conference logo.

Festivities and entertainment
This year's NHL Fan Fair, featuring various fan activities during All-Star Weekend, was held between Thursday, January 24 and Sunday, January 27 at the San Jose Convention Center.

Country music artist Chad Brownlee performed the Canadian national anthem while singer Lauren Jauregui performed the U.S. national anthem. Singer Bebe Rexha performed during the second intermission. The Stanford Band also performed during the game.

Television
The All-Star Game and skills competition were broadcast in the United States by NBC and NBCSN, respectively. In Canada, both the All-Star Game and skills competition were broadcast In English on both CBC and Sportsnet (under the Hockey Night in Canada branding), and on TVA Sports in French.

The NHL conducted a trial of player and puck tracking during the All-Star Game with technology developed by one of the German Fraunhofer Institutes using transmitters embedded inside pucks and jerseys. The technology enables on-air features such as speed displays, puck tracking graphics (reminiscent of the FoxTrax graphics utilized in the late 1990s by previous U.S. national NHL broadcaster Fox, developed by Sportvision), and marker graphics hovering above players. Using the system, NBC and Sportsnet both showcased some tracking data on their respective broadcasts, while NBC also offered a secondary broadcast of the game via its digital platforms to showcase expanded real-time statistics and other information. NHL Commissioner Gary Bettman stated during All-Star weekend that the league planned to deploy the system to all 31 NHL arenas prior to the start of the 2019–20 NHL season.

References

National Hockey League All-Star Games
All
National Hockey League All-Star Game
Sports competitions in San Jose, California
National Hockey League All-Star Game
Ice hockey competitions in California